Sushilavati Government Women’s Junior College is a state-run science and arts women's junior college in sector four of Rourkela.

History
The college since its beginning in 1980 was known as Rourkela Women's College. In 1989 it was renamed as Sushilavati Government Women’s Junior College which was taken and funded by Government of Odisha to run its curriculum.

The junior college is affiliated to Council of Higher Secondary Education, Odisha, which prepares students for Senior Higher Secondary examination conducted by CHSE Board (Class 11 and Class 12 Courses) in the subjects of science and arts.

See also
 Sushilavati Government Women’s College, Rourkela

References

Junior colleges in India
Girls' schools in Odisha
Schools in Rourkela
Educational institutions established in 1980
1980 establishments in Orissa